Star Wars is an ongoing Star Wars comic series published by Marvel Comics since January 14, 2015. Originally written by Jason Aaron with art by John Cassaday, it is set between the 1977 film Star Wars and its 1980 sequel, The Empire Strikes Back. The series features classic Star Wars characters Luke Skywalker, Princess Leia, Han Solo, Chewbacca, and R2-D2. It was one of three new Star Wars comics by Marvel announced in July 2014, along with Darth Vader and the limited series Princess Leia.

In 2017, Jason Aaron stepped down as the comic's writer and was replaced by Kieron Gillen while the art was taken over by Salvador Larroca.  In 2019, Marvel announced that the series will be finished after 75 issues. A new comic of the same name continues the story after the events of The Empire Strikes Back and launched with issue #1 on January 1, 2020.

Plot
The Star Wars series focuses on Luke, Leia and Han's continued conflict against the Galactic Empire with their fellow Rebel allies soon after the destruction of the first Death Star. As the series begins, Leia leads a covert Rebel mission to destroy an Imperial weapons factory, attracting the attention of Darth Vader. In issues #4–5, Luke returns to Tatooine, searching Obi-Wan Kenobi's abandoned house for anything of interest regarding Obi-Wan or his father. He fights Boba Fett but also discovers Obi-Wan's journals, which Luke reads in issues #7, #15, #20, and #26–30. In issue #6, Fett reveals to Vader that the Rebel pilot who destroyed the Death Star is named Skywalker; the issue also introduces Sana Starros, who is dramatically introduced as Han Solo's wife but later confesses to have only posed as his spouse during a previous scam. She becomes a recurring character. Issues #13–14 are part of the "Vader Down" crossover with the Darth Vader comic series. In issues #16–19, the Rebels enlist the help of antagonist Doctor Aphra. Issues #21–25 involve capturing a Star Destroyer. Issues #26–30 flash back to Yoda's history before the events of The Phantom Menace, as recounted in Obi-Wan's journals. Issues #31–32 are part of "The Screaming Citadel" crossover with the Doctor Aphra series. In issues #38–43, the Rebels fight to prevent the Imperials from obtaining kyber crystals on Jedha. In issues #44–49, they try to recruit Mon Cala to the Rebel cause even as the world experiences local unrest. In issues #50–55, the Mon Calamari, including Admiral Ackbar, join their cause, even as Queen Trios of Shu-Torun betrays them, allowing the Empire to attack. Issues #56–61 sees the Rebellion crippled and scattered. In issues #62–67, Leia strikes back against Queen Trios with the aid of the unorthodox Partisans. The closing story arc, told in issues #68–75, sees the Rebels avoiding Imperial probe droids, getting wrapped up in a crime syndicate's conflict with the Empire, and aiding the rock creatures of an unstable world against Imperial forces led by Vader.

The 2020 relaunch picks up before the epilogue of The Empire Strikes Back, when Lando Calrissian returns to Cloud City to retrieve Lobot and help Luke look for his lightsaber. Unable to locate his old weapon, Luke learns of a High Republic-era Jedi outpost, where he finds a yellow lightsaber and battles the spirit of the Grand Inquisitor. Leia leads the Rebellion (including the parents of Poe Dameron), but their security codes are compromised by the Empire, forcing the Rebels to improvise. Subsequently, in the War of the Bounty Hunters crossover event, the Rebels try to rescue the frozen Han from Crimson Dawn (led by his old flame Qi'ra), but Fett is able to recover his prize and deliver it to Jabba the Hutt. Crimson Dawn's story continues in the Crimson Reign crossover event and the spin-off miniseries Hidden Empire, while the Rebels prepare to mount their last stand against the Empire.

Characters and development
Aaron said in 2014, "We wanted this to feel like the movies. We wanted to feel like we were hired to do the direct sequel to the original film ... It's very much a team book and we've got all the main players here. Luke, Han, Leia, Chewie, the droids, and Darth Vader all get big moments in this first arc, and that's our core cast going forward." He explained that Luke's story is a main thrust of the comic, considering where the character is at this point in the timeline, adding:

Aaron also noted that Han is in "an interesting spot at this point in the timeline ... We don't know how fully committed he is to this Rebellion, and we're in the very early stages of his relationship with Leia ... And of course, you know with Han, eventually his past is going to start catching up to him."

Publication

Star Wars was one of three new Star Wars comics by Marvel announced in July 2014, along with Princess Leia and Darth Vader. The Star Wars comic was set to be written by Jason Aaron and illustrated by John Cassaday, and released in January 2015. Several variant covers were printed for the first issue. Simone Bianchi was the guest artist for issue #7. Stuart Immonen took over as artist with issue #8 in July 2015, completing the series' second story arc through issue #12.

Collected editions

Trade paperback

Hardback omnibus

References

External links
 

2015 comics debuts
Comics based on Star Wars
Comics by Jason Aaron
Marvel Comics titles